Yair Garbuz - is an Israeli artist. He was director of the art school at Beit Berl Teachers Training College
Konstantin Gennadyevich Garbuz - is a Russian professional footballer. He plays for FC Fakel Voronezh. He made his debut in the Russian Premier League in 2006 for FC Rostov